Aduthurai was a state assembly constituency in the Indian state of Tamil Nadu. The elections conducted in the constituency and winners are listed below.

Members of the Legislative Assembly

Election results

1971

1967

1962

1957

1952

References

External links
 

Former assembly constituencies of Tamil Nadu